Workers' Dreadnought was a newspaper published by variously named political parties led by Sylvia Pankhurst.

The paper was started by Pankhurst at the suggestion of Zelie Emerson, after Pankhurst had been expelled from the Women's Social and Political Union by her mother and sister.   The paper was published on behalf of the newly formed East London Federation of Suffragettes.

Provisionally titled Workers' Mate, the newspaper first appeared on 8 March 1914 (14 March according to one source 21 March according to another), the day of suffragette rally at which Pankhurst was due to speak, in Trafalgar Square, as The Woman's Dreadnought, with a circulation of 30,000,, subsequently (on number 10, of May 1914) stated as 20,000.

When the editor was imprisoned, Norah Smyth alternated as acting editor with Jack O'Sullivan.  For many years, Smyth had used her photography skills to provide pictures for the newspaper of East End life, particularly of women and children living in poverty.

In July 1917 the name was changed to Workers' Dreadnought, which initially had a circulation of 10,000.  Its slogan changed to "Socialism, Internationalism, Votes for All", and then in July 1918 to "For International Socialism", reflecting increasing opposition to Parliamentarism in the party.

On 19 June 1920 Workers' Dreadnought was adopted as the official weekly organ of the Communist Party (British Section of the Third International). Pankhurst continued publishing the newspaper until June 1924.

References

External links
Workers' Dreadnought text archive - on libcom.org library

Publications established in 1914
Publications disestablished in 1924
Political newspapers published in the United Kingdom
Women's suffrage in the United Kingdom
Left communism
Defunct newspapers published in the United Kingdom
1914 establishments in the United Kingdom
1924 disestablishments in the United Kingdom
London newspapers
Socialist newspapers published in the United Kingdom